17th NSFC Awards
January 2, 1983

Best Film: 
 Tootsie 
The 17th National Society of Film Critics Awards, given on 2 January 1983, honored the best filmmaking of 1982.

Winners

Best Picture 
1. Tootsie
2. E.T. the Extra-Terrestrial
3. Moonlighting

Best Director 
1. Steven Spielberg – E.T. the Extra-Terrestrial
2. Sydney Pollack – Tootsie
3. Jean-Jacques Beineix – Diva
3. Francesco Rosi – Three Brothers (Tre fratelli)

Best Actor 
1. Dustin Hoffman – Tootsie
2. Ben Kingsley – Gandhi
3. Peter O'Toole – My Favorite Year

Best Actress 
1. Meryl Streep – Sophie's Choice
2. Jessica Lange – Frances and Tootsie
3. Diane Keaton – Shoot the Moon

Best Supporting Actor 
1. Mickey Rourke – Diner
2. John Lithgow – The World According to Garp

Best Supporting Actress 
1. Jessica Lange – Tootsie
2. Glenn Close – The World According to Garp
3. Teri Garr – Tootsie

Best Screenplay 
1. Murray Schisgal and Larry Gelbart – Tootsie
2. Barry Levinson – Diner

Best Cinematography 
Philippe Rousselot – Diva

References

External links
Past Awards

1982
National Society of Film Critics Awards
National Society of Film Critics Awards
National Society of Film Critics Awards